James A. Berlin (January 7, 1942 – February 2, 1994) was an American scholar, professor, writer, and theorist in the field of composition studies, known for his scholarship on the history of rhetoric and composition theory.

Berlin was born in Hamtramck, Michigan and attended St. Florian High School. He earned his BA from Central Michigan University and his Ph.D. from the University of Michigan in Victorian literature in 1975. He served as a professor of English at Wichita State University, at the University of Cincinnati, where he directed first-year English from 1981 to 1985, and at Purdue University from 1987 to 1994. Between Cincinnati and Purdue, Berlin served as visiting professor at the University of Texas and at Penn State University.

Along with other leading figures in contemporary rhetorical theory such as Lisa Ede, Robert Inkster, Charles Kneupper, Linda Flower, Janice Lauer, and Victor Vitanza, Berlin participated in an NEH fellowship-in-residence to work with Richard Young on the topic of rhetorical invention. It was at this stage in his career that Berlin invested heavily in the work of Karl Marx. Later, Berlin would draw upon Göran Therborn's version of Marxist ideology, particularly because Berlin found in Therborn a comrade who recognized the power and function of rhetorical principles.

On February 2, 1994, Berlin died following a heart attack.

Major publications

Rhetorics, Poetics, and Cultures: Refiguring College English Studies. Urbana, Illinois: NCTE, 1996.

Rhetoric and Reality: Writing Instruction in American Colleges. 1900–1985. Carbondale: Southern Illinois UP, 1987.

Writing Instruction in Nineteenth-Century American Colleges. Carbondale: Southern Illinois UP, 1984.

"Cultural Studies." Encyclopedia of Rhetoric and Composition. Ed. Theresa Enos. NY: Garland, 1996. 154–56.

"Poststructuralism, Cultural Studies, and the Composition Classroom." Rhetoric Review 11 (Fall 1992): 16–33. Rpt. Professing the New Rhetoric. Ed. Theresa Enos and Stuart C. Brown. Englewood Cliffs, New Jersey: Prentice Hall, 1994. 461–480.

"Revisionary Histories of Rhetoric: Politics, Power, and Plurality." Writing Histories of Rhetoric. Ed. Victor J. Vitanza. Carbondale: Southern Illinois UP, 1994. 112–127.

"Composition Studies and Cultural Studies: Collapsing Boundaries." Into the Field: Sites of Composition Studies. Ed. Anne Ruggles Gere. NY: MLA,1993. 99–116.

"Composition and Cultural Studies." Composition and Resistance. Eds. Hurlbert, C. Mark and Michael Blitz. Portsmouth, NH: Boynton/Cook, 1991.

"Postmodernism, Politics, and Histories of Rhetorics." PRE/TEXT 11.3–4 (1990): 169–187.

"Rhetoric and Ideology in the Writing Class." College English 50 (1988): 477–494.

Berlin, James A., et al. Octalog. "The Politics of Historiography." Rhetoric Review 7 (1988): 5–49.

"Revisionary History: The Dialectical Method." PRE/TEXT 8.1–2 (1987): 47–61.

"Rhetoric and Poetics in the English Department: Our Nineteenth-Century Inheritance." College English 47 (1985): 531–533.

"Contemporary Composition: The Major Pedagogical Theories." College English 44 (1982): 765–777.

Berlin, James A., and Robert P. Inkster. "Current-Traditional Rhetoric: Paradigm and Practice." Freshman English News 8. 3 (Winter 1980): 1–4, 13–14.

"Richard Whately and Current-Traditional Rhetoric." College English 42 (September 1980): 10–17.

Notes

References
Heinemann Books
Rhetoric and Reality: Writing Instruction in American Colleges, 1900–1985, Carbondale: Southern Illinois UP, 1987. 
In Memory of James A. Berlin

Rhetoric theorists
University of Michigan College of Literature, Science, and the Arts alumni
Purdue University faculty
Teachers of English
1942 births
1994 deaths
Central Michigan University alumni
University of Texas faculty
Pennsylvania State University faculty